The Midnite Jamboree is a radio program that has aired on WSM in Nashville, Tennessee since May 3, 1947. It was launched by country musician Ernest Tubb. The program was recorded from Ernest Tubb Record Shop in Nashville, Tennessee each Saturday. Through a brokered programming arrangement with Ernest Tubb Record Shop, the Jamboree aired following the Grand Ole Opry; as the program's name implied, it aired at midnight Central Time.

In its later years, the Midnite Jamboree was  billed as "the second longest running radio show in history." After this was debunked, it revised its claim to be second-longest only among country radio shows, but this too is disputed as the Wheeling Jamboree and Renfro Valley Gatherin' both date to earlier, and none of the three have had continuous runs. Both of the other contenders have changed stations since their debuts while the Midnite Jamboree has not.

In recent years, the show has been recorded at 10pm on Saturday night and played on WSM one week later at midnight on Sunday morning. Archived episodes occasionally air on the occasion that a new episode is not produced.

During a legal dispute over the ownership of the Ernest Tubb Record Shop in Summer 2022, the show was suspended for several weeks. It returned in September 2022 under the leadership of Ernest Tubb's grandson, Dale and currently airs weekly on WSM.

Show format
The Midnite Jamboree begins each episode with the theme song "Walking the Floor Over You" by the show's namesake Ernest Tubb, followed by playing a record from Jimmie C. Rodgers. The remainder of the show is devoted to a single country music act, who plays a set lasting approximately an hour. Many of the acts play a shorter set at the Grand Ole Opry earlier in the night before playing a full set at the Midnite Jamboree. The set is periodically interrupted to play songs from featured albums on sale at the record shop. The Midnite Jamboree was particularly known for focusing on traditional country/western and bluegrass music, avoiding contemporary acts because it believed that the older styles were what audiences wanted to see.

History
The Midnite Jamboree has had several homes from its inception in 1947 through 2022.   The show's first home was at the original Ernest Tubb Record Shop at 720 Commerce Street, which opened May 3, 1947.  In 1951, the store and the radio program moved to 417 Broadway and this location became the show's most famous home, hosting the show from 1951 until 1976.  On June 2, 1976 a second Ernest Tubb Record Shop was opened on Demonbreun street in Nashville and it became the home of the Jamboree on June 12, 1976.  In May 1979, another store was built at Music Valley Drive near Opryland, and this store became the home of the Jamboree from 1979 until January 1995.   In January 1995, a new Ernest Tubb Record Shop and Texas Troubadour Theater were opened in Music Valley Village.  In January 1995, the show moved to the Texas Troubadour Theatre, closer to the current Grand Ole Opry House. It briefly shut down in March and April 2015 due to financial shortfalls; the program had never been profitable, but declines in record sales had made keeping the show up and running unsustainable. In an effort to draw larger crowds, the previously live program—airing at midnight Central Time—shifted to earlier in the evening, as there was little to do in that section of Nashville between the time the Opry ended and the Jamboree began. In July 2021, following a pandemic hiatus in which WSM aired reruns of the program, the show returned to Ernest Tubb Record Shop at 417 Broadway. The move also coincided with the departure of Jennifer Herron, the show's host of 17 years.

On March 11, 2022, the owners of Ernest Tubb Record Shop announced that it would be going out of business in the spring, ending the program. Saving Country Music postulated that a court had ordered a liquidation of the shop to settle a dispute between Jesse Lee Jones and David McCormick, both of whom held ownership stakes at various points in the 21st century. Encore broadcasts have aired in the time slot on WSM since the closure was announced, with wraparound segments continuing to count upward as if the programs were new and still in production. A special broadcast was recorded on the program's 75th anniversary on May 3, 2022 and broadcast on WSM the following Saturday; that would be the final new episode, as the store closed that week.

In the summer of 2022, WSM occupied the former time slot with occasional specials from Jones's other music venues in Texas and reruns of classic Grand Ole Opry segments.

In July 2022, it was announced that an investment group led by Nashville-based real estate investor and developer Brad Bars, Dale Tubb (Tubb’s grandson) and Ilya Toshinskiy, a Russian-born and locally based musician, purchased the Ernest Tubb Record Shop.  The Midnite Jamboree returned to the air with new episodes on September 17, 2022 with an episode hosted by Grand Ole Opry legend Jeannie Seely.  The episode was taped at The Troubadour (formerly the Texas Troubadour Theater) as a special honoring her 55th anniversary as a member of the Grand Ole Opry.  On September 21, The Troubadour's official Facebook page announced that Rhonda Vincent would be hosting a new episode on Saturday, September 24th

See also
List of longest-running radio programmes

References

External links
Official site
The Revived Site
Midnite Jamboree audio archives

American country music radio programs
Culture of Nashville, Tennessee
1947 radio programme debuts